Hongkong International Terminals Limited (HIT) is one of several key container port operators in the Port of Hong Kong owned by Hutchison Port Holdings, which is the largest port operator in Hong Kong and the world.

HIT operates 12 berths in Terminal 4, 6, 7 and 9 (North) of Kwai Tsing Container Terminals. It also set up a joint-venture (COSCO-HIT) with COSCO Pacific to operate 2 berths in Terminal 8 (East).

In 2005, Hutchison Whampoa sold 20% shares of HIT (including the 20% of 50% = 10% rights of Terminal 8 East) to PortCapital Ltd (a company that major shareholder was PSA International at that time). A year later, Hutchison Whampoa sold 20% shares of its wholly subsidiary Hutchison Port Holdings to PSA International.

In 2009, China Resources Holdings acquired 10% shares of HIT from its subsidiary China Resources Enterprise.

In 2013, the dock workers went on a strike in the container berths HIT for better pay and working conditions.

See also
 2013 Hong Kong dock strike

References

External links

Hongkong International Terminals Limited

Transport in Hong Kong
Ports and harbours of Hong Kong
Port operating companies
Kwai Tsing District
Kwai Chung
Tsing Yi
Stonecutters Island
CK Hutchison Holdings